Ultimatum is the second full-length album by the band Nightstick.

Track listing
 "Ultimatum: 'Cut It Off, Then Kill It'" (Robert Williams, Kurt Habelt) – 11:24
 "United Snakes" (Williams) – 4:34
 "The Pentagon" (Williams, Habelt) – 04:31
 "Pig in Shit" (Williams) – 5:48
 "4 More Years" (Williams) – 12:04
 "August 6, 1945: a. Flight b. Fright" (Williams, Alex Smith) – 07:31
 "Dream Of The Witches' Sabbath/Massacre Of Innocence (Air Attack)" (07:12)
 "Ultimatum: 'He... Is... Dead... Wrong' (4 Track Version)" (07:08)
 "Ultimatum: (Live @ Mama Kin's)" (09:11)

Personnel
 Alex Smith – bass/vocals/violin
 Cotie Cowgill – guitars
 Robert Williams – drums

Guest musicians
 Jim Hobbs – alto sax (#1)
 Bob Clark – guitar (#7)
 Tony Rossi – guitar (#7)

Nightstick (band) albums
1998 albums